The Commission for the Study and Evaluation of the Communist Totalitarian Regime of the Republic of Moldova is a commission instituted in Moldova by Acting President of Moldova Mihai Ghimpu to investigate the Moldavian SSR, the state which administered the country as a Soviet Socialist Republic from 1940 to 1991, and provide a comprehensive report with the purpose of condemnation of Communism as experienced by Moldovan people.

Formation 
On January 14, 2010, Moldova's Acting President, Speaker Mihai Ghimpu, decreed to set up the "Commission for the Study and Evaluation of the Totalitarian Communist Regime in the Republic of Moldova". The commission aimed at studying the claims about crimes of Soviet regime in the former Moldavian SSR from 1940 to 1991, as well as the period before 1940 when the country was an autonomous republic within the Ukrainian SSR. The commission was mandated to deliver a report by June 1, 2010, and subsequently to publish several volumes of documents on the main aspects related to crimes in Soviet Moldavia as well as to other human rights infringements.

The commission is headed by historian Gheorghe E. Cojocaru, the vice presidents are Igor Cașu and Sergiu Musteață, and the secretary being Mihail Taşcă. Igor Cașu contributed to the Presidential Commission for the Study of the Communist Dictatorship in Romania.

The presidential decree no. 165 was issued according to resolutions 1096/1996 and 1481/2006 of the Parliamentary Assembly of the Council of Europe and Art. 94 of the Constitution of Moldova (1994).

A few days after the presidential decree was issued, Vladimir Tismăneanu wrote:

Members
The members of the commission are:

Activity 

The commission is formed of 30 members, comprising doctors in history, sociology, philology, economics, philosophy and law. The commission will study and analyze the 1917-1991 period of the communist regime. The activity of the Party of Communists of the Republic of Moldova from 2001 to 2009 will be not covered by the report unless it is proved that it continued some practices of the former Communist Party of Moldova. According to its Statute adopted in 2008, article 1, the Party of Communists of the Republic of Moldova is a "lawful successor and heir of the Communist Party of [Soviet] Moldavia both in terms of ideas and traditions".

The Commission for the Study and Evaluation of the Communist Totalitarian Regime in Moldova met in its first session on January 17, when there were created 7 workgroups in order to study the documents and the materials regarding the activity of the main institutions involved in the establishment and perpetuating the communist totalitarian regime in Moldova.

Final report
The commission was to present its report to the President on 1 June 2010.

Footnotes

External links
Moldovan authorities going to condemn communist regime…
Hundreds of thousands of cases to be examined by commission for combating Communism 
 Preşedintele interimar al Republicii Moldova Mihai Ghimpu a emis un decret prezidenţial privind constituirea Comisiei pentru studierea şi aprecierea regimului comunist totalitar din Republica Moldova.
http://www.privesc.eu/?p=1884 - The first press conference of the commission, Moldpress, January 18, 2010. Video.
https://web.archive.org/web/20100309165120/http://www.timpul.md/article/2010/01/18/5881 - interview with Gheorghe Cojocaru, president of the commission.
 Vladimir Tismăneanu, Un moment istoric: Comisia de studiere a comunismului
http://www.europalibera.org/content/article/1931577.html - Pro and Contra
https://web.archive.org/web/20100424000223/http://www.alttv.md/index.php?option=com_mediaplayer1&id=235&title=In_Triunghi_10.flv&task=view, interview with Igor Caşu, vice president of the commission, January 19, 2010
http://www.flux.md/articole/8586/ - Condamnarea comunismului nu înseamnă scoaterea PCRM în afara legii, articol de Ecaterina Deleu
http://www.e-democracy.md/files/parties/pcrm-statute-2008-ro.pdf - Statute of the Party of Communists of the Republic of Moldova, adopted on the 15th of March 2008.
http://www.info-prim.md/?x=20&y=28559 - about the structure of the report, interview with Mihai Tasca.
https://web.archive.org/web/20100211134340/http://www.timpul.md/news/2010/02/08/6432 - Timpul: Începe Marea desecretizare!
Andrei Cuşco: "Şansa practică pe care o oferă munca în cadrul Comisiei oricărui istoric este accesul neîngrădit la archive şi desecretizarea urgentă şi totală a acestora"
https://web.archive.org/web/20100413224643/http://www.contrafort.md/2010/181-182/1780.html
Igor Caşu: "Nu poţi să avansezi spre europenizare fără o voinţă fermă de distanţare de crimele şi încălcările flagrante ale dreptului omului din perioada sovietică"
https://web.archive.org/web/20100409074555/http://www.contrafort.md/2010/181-182/1779.html
Petru Negură: "Îmi voi aduce contribuţia la studierea practicilor de "rezistenţă" ale populaţiei civile (şi ale intelectualilor) faţă de măsurile repressive şi oppressive applicate de regimul sovietic"
https://web.archive.org/web/20100409074600/http://www.contrafort.md/2010/181-182/1781.html
http://revistapresei.hotnews.ro/stiri-radio_tv-6949474-igor-casu-rfi-nkvd-din-republica-autonoma-socialista-sovietica-moldoveneasca-ordona-doar-singura-sedinta-uciderea-200-300-persoane.htm
Lavinia Stan, A Breakthrough for Moldova: The Commission for the Study and Evaluation of the Totalitarian Communist Regime Thursday,  Mar 18 2010 http://laviniastan.wordpress.com/2010/03/18/a-breakthrough-for-moldova-the-commission-for-the-study-and-evaluation-of-the-   totalitarian-communist-regime/
http://www.evz.ro/detalii/stiri/dezvrajirea-in-500-de-file-kgb-ul-civilizator-si-romanofilii-barbari-891381.html
http://www.evz.ro/detalii/stiri/cum-au-deconspirat-troika-nkvd-cei-infectati-de-spiritul-cosmopolit-891423.html
Interview with Igor Casu, vice-president of the commission, in Russian: first part - http://enews.md/articles/view/266/,
second part - http://www.enews.md/articles/view/274/, third part - https://web.archive.org/web/20100420181200/http://enews.md/articles/view/281/
International Conference May 24–25, 2010: http://www.tv7.md/?page=news&id=21574&lang=ru&list=1; http://www.protv.md/stiri/jurnale-de-stiri/stirile-pro-tv-cu-sorina-obreja-25-05-10.html

Government agencies established in 2010
Communism in Moldova
Anti-communism in Moldova
Society of Moldova
Legal history of Moldova
Political history of Moldova
Alliance for European Integration
2010 in Moldova
Decommunization